Jonny Quest (also known as The Adventures of Jonny Quest) is an American animated science fiction adventure television series about a boy who accompanies his scientist father on extraordinary adventures. It was produced by Hanna-Barbera Productions for Screen Gems, and was created and designed by comic book artist Doug Wildey.

Inspired by radio serials and comics in the action-adventure genre, it featured more realistic art, human characters, and stories than Hanna-Barbera's previous cartoon programs. It was the first of several Hanna-Barbera action-based adventure shows—which later included Space Ghost, The Herculoids, and Birdman and the Galaxy Trio. It ran on ABC in prime time on early Friday nights for one season in 1964/1965.

After 20 years of reruns, during which time the series appeared on all three major U.S. television networks of the time, new episodes, The New Adventures of Jonny Quest for syndication in 1986 as part of The Funtastic World of Hanna-Barbera's second season. Two telefilms, a comic book series, and a second revival series, The Real Adventures of Jonny Quest, were produced in the 1990s. Characters from the series also appear throughout The Venture Bros.

Development
Comic book artist Doug Wildey, after having worked on Cambria Productions' 1962 animated television series Space Angel, found work at the Hanna-Barbera studio, which asked him to design a series starring the radio drama adventure character Jack Armstrong, the All-American Boy.

Wildey wrote and drew a presentation, using such magazines as Popular Science, Popular Mechanics, and Science Digest "to project what would be happening 10 years hence", and devising or fancifully updating such devices as a "snowskimmer" and hydrofoils. When Hanna-Barbera could not or would not obtain the rights to Jack Armstrong, the studio had Wildey rework the concept. Wildey said he "went home and wrote Jonny Quest that night—which was not that tough." For inspiration he drew on Jackie Cooper and Frankie Darrow movies, Milton Caniff's comic strip Terry and the Pirates, and, at the behest of Hanna-Barbera, the James Bond movie Dr. No. As Wildey described in 1986, producer Joe Barbera had seen that first film about the English superspy "and wanted to get in stuff like '007' numbers. Which we included, by the way, in the first [episode of] Jonny Quest. It was called 'Jonny Quest File 037' or something. We dropped that later; it didn't work. But that was his father's code name as he worked for the government as a scientist and that kind of thing." Hanna-Barbera refused to give him a "created by" credit, Wildey said, and he and studio "finally arrived on 'based on an idea created by', and that was my credit."

The prime-time animated TV series Jonny Quest debuted on ABC at 7:30p.m. EDT on Friday, September 18, 1964. As comics historian Daniel Herman wrote,

Wildey did not design the more cartoonishly drawn pet bulldog, Bandit, which was designed by animator Richard Bickenbach.

Although they do not appear in any episode, scenes from the Jack Armstrong test film were incorporated into the Jonny Quest closing credits. They are the scenes of Jack Armstrong and Billy Fairfield escaping from African warriors by hovercraft. The test sequence and a number of drawings and storyboards by Wildey were used to sell the series to ABC and sponsors.

The show's working titles were The Saga of Chip Baloo, which Wildey said "wasn't really serious, but that was it for the beginning", and Quest File 037. The name Quest was selected from a phone book, for its adventurous implications.

Characters

[[File:Jonny-quest-opening-title.jpg|right|thumb|300px|The Quest team. Front row (left to right): Dr. Benton Quest and "Race" Bannon. Back row: Jonny Quest, Hadji, and Bandit.]]

The main five characters on the show are:

Jonathan "Jonny" Quest is a Tom Swift-like 11-year-old American boy who lost his mother at an early age. Although unenthusiastic in his schooling, he is intelligent, brave, adventurous, and generally athletic with a proficiency in judo, scuba diving, and the handling of firearms. He takes on responsibility willingly, attending to his homework (and/or household chores), telling the truth, and treating adults with respect. His voice was provided by actor Tim Matheson.
Dr. Benton C. Quest is Jonny's father and a scientific genius who works for the U.S. Government. He is considered "one of the three top scientists in the world", with interests and technical know-how spanning many fields. Raising Jonny and Hadji as a widowed father, he is benevolent, conscientious and decent, even though he is ready, willing and able to take decisive action when necessary for survival or defense. Dr. Quest was voiced by John Stephenson for five episodes, and by Don Messick for the remainder of the series. One of the government agents in the first episode mentions that Jonny lost his mother sometime earlier but does not say when or, more importantly, how she died. The fact a special agent was assigned to protect Jonny suggests Mrs. Quest may have been killed by foreign agents. As the two agents in the first episode fly to Palm Key to meet with Dr. Quest, one explains to the other that "if Jonny fell into the hands of enemy agents, Dr. Quest's value to science would be seriously impaired." So there is definite concern that Jonny might be kidnapped.
Roger T. "Race" Bannon is the special agent from Intelligence One assigned to safeguard Jonny "24 hours a day and 7days a week as tutor, companion and all-around watchdog". Race was born in Wilmette, Illinois, to John and Sarah Bannon. He is an expert in judo, having a third-degree black belt as well as the ability to defeat notorious experts in various sporting techniques, including sumo wrestlers. He is also a pilot. The character was voiced by Mike Road, with his design modeled on actor Jeff Chandler. The name is a combination of Race Dunhill and Stretch Bannon from an earlier comic strip. The surname Bannon is Irish (from 'O'Banain') meaning "white".
Hadji Singh is a streetwise 11-year-old Kolkata orphan who becomes the adopted son of Dr. Benton Quest, as well as Jonny's best friend and adoptive brother. Rarely depicted without his bejeweled turban and Jodhpuri, he is proficient in judo, which he learned from an American Marine. The seventh son of a seventh son, Hadji seems to possess mystical powers (including snake-charming, levitation and hypnotism), which may or may not be attributed to parlor trickery. The Quest family meets Hadji while Dr. Quest is lecturing at Calcutta University; he subsequently joined the Quest team after saving Dr. Quest's life (by using a basket lid to block a knife thrown at the doctor). Although slightly more circumspect than Jonny, he can reliably be talked into participating in most any adventure by his adoptive brother. He is voiced by Danny Bravo.
Bandit is Jonny's pet dog, so named because he is white with black markings - including what appears to be a black domino mask around his eyes. This coloration is occasionally instrumental in foiling adversaries. Bandit is unique among his fellow Hanna-Barbera dogs (such as Scooby-Doo, Huckleberry Hound, and Hong Kong Phooey), as he is a regular non-anthropomorphic dog. Still, he seems uncannily able to understand human speech and is capable of complex facial expressions. Don Messick provided Bandit's vocal effects, which were combined with an archived clip of an actual dog barking. Creator Doug Wildey wanted to have a monkey as Jonny's pet, but he was overruled by Hanna-Barbera. Wildey has said Bandit was intended to be a bulldog, though his appearance is more similar to a Boston Terrier.

The Quest family has a home compound in the Florida Keys (on the island of Palm Key), but their adventures take them around the world. The Quest team travels the globe studying scientific mysteries, which generally end up being explained as the work of various adversaries. Such pursuits get them into scrapes with opponents, ranging from espionage robots and electric monsters to Egyptian mummies and prehistoric pterosaurs.

Although most menaces appeared in only one episode each, one recurring nemesis is known as Dr. Zin, an Asian criminal mastermind. With yellow skin and a maniacal laugh, Zin was an example of the Yellow Peril villains common in Cold War-era fiction.The supervillain book: the evil side of comics and Hollywood, Gina Renée Misiroglu, Michael Eury, Visible Ink Press, 2006 The voices of Dr. Zin and other assorted characters were done by Vic Perrin.

Race's mysterious old flame, Jade (voiced by Cathy Lewis), appears in two episodes, as do the characters of Corbin (an Intelligence One agent), and the Professor (a scientist colleague of Dr. Quest's).

Broadcast historyJonny Quest first aired from September 18, 1964, to March 11, 1965, in prime time on the ABC network and was an almost instant success, both critically and ratings-wise but it was canceled after one season due to the animated show's high production costs.

In 1967, Jonny Quest ran on CBS Saturday mornings/early afternoons through 1970.

Like the original Star Trek television series, this series was a big money-maker in syndication, but this avenue to profits was not as well-known when the show was canceled in 1965. Along with another Hanna-Barbera series, The Jetsons, Jonny Quest is one of the few television series to have aired on each of the Big Three television networks in the United States.

Episodes

All writing credits taken from Classic Jonny Quest.

See also The New Adventures of Jonny Quest.

Merchandise
Items released in the United States during or shortly after the show's original run on ABC included:

 A simple substitution code ring was offered as a promotion by PF Flyers. The ring featured a movable code wheel, magnifying lens, signal flasher and a secret compartment. The code was implemented by a rotating circular inner code dial marked "ABCDEFGHIJKLMNOPQRSTUVWXYZ" and a fixed outer code marked "WEARPFSLQMYBUHXVCZNDKIOTGJ", i.e. "Wear PFs."
 Whitman released a Jonny Quest coloring book under two different covers in 1965.
During the show's 1964–65 season, a Jonny Quest card game was produced and distributed in the United States by Milton Bradley and in Australia under license to John Sands Ltd.
 Milton Bradley also released six Jonny Quest puzzle sets in the United States, two apiece for three different age levels.
 Transogram produced three Jonny Quest coloring sets: paint-by-number, crayon-by-number and pencil-by-number.
 Transogram also released a Jonny Quest board game.
 Kenner released two different packages of its Give-A-Show projector in 1965 with different Jonny Quest slides. In 1969, it released a projector for short films, including a Jonny Quest cartridge.
 Hanna-Barbera records published a 28-minute audio story, "Jonny Quest in 20,000 Leagues Under the Sea", on an LP that featured a new version of the theme song by Shorty Rogers. There was a 7-inch 45rpm record with an abbreviated version of the story, and another 45 titled "Favorite Songs of Jonny Quest", with the LP's theme song and other Hanna-Barbera music.

Home media
Various episodes of the classic series have been released on VHS and DVD over the years.

On May 11, 2004, Warner Home Video released Jonny Quest: The Complete First Season on DVD in Region 1, which features all 26 episodes of the original series, although some have been edited for content, and nearly all episodes have incorrect closing credits.

On June 11, 2019, Warner Home Video (via the Warner Archive Collection) released the original 1960s Jonny Quest series on Blu-ray for the first time. For this release, a new, high-definition master was created, and the episodes were presented unedited and uncensored. The missing dialogue removed for the 2004 DVD version has been restored, but the audio has problems that were on the DVD set.

On October 27, 2016, La-La Land released a limited-edition 2-CD set of music from the series, including an extended version of the opening theme minus the sound effects.

Appearances in other programs
 Jonny Quest and Hadji both appeared as elderly in the I Am Weasel episode "I Am My Lifetime".
 The characters appear in Harvey Birdman, Attorney at Law with Jonny Quest voiced by Dee Bradley Baker, Dr. Benton Quest voiced by Neil Ross, Race Bannon voiced by Thom Pinto, and Hadji voiced by Wally Wingert. In "Bannon Custody Trial", Dr. Zin uses a robot stand-in for Race in a scheme to sue Dr. Quest for custody of Jonny and Hadji, but is foiled by Harvey Birdman, who explains how Zin was working on his scheme. Zin is then arrested, and it is revealed that Race was on vacation. In "Return of Birdgirl", Race Bannon and Dr. Quest are attempting to get gay marriage recognized by the Justices League, a combination of the Justice League of America and the Supreme Court of the United States.
 The Adult Swim animated series The Venture Bros. is a parody of Jonny Quest and similar adventure series, and has also used the original characters – or thinly veiled versions of them – as guest characters.
 Characters from Jonny Quest appeared in Scooby-Doo! Mystery Incorporated episodes "Pawn of Shadows" and "Heart of Evil" with Dr. Benton Quest voiced by Eric Bauza, Race Bannon voiced by Christopher Corey Smith, and Dr. Zin also voiced by Eric Bauza. Dr. Quest was responsible for the origin of Dynomutt while Dr. Zin was also depicted as an enemy of Blue Falcon.
 In 2015, a crossover with Tom and Jerry titled Tom and Jerry: Spy Quest was released. Tom and Jerry joined forces with the Jonny Quest cast and even Droopy who helped Jade to stop an evil cat army from stealing Dr. Benton Quest's newest invention for Dr. Zin.
 Jonny Quest and Hadji appears in Jellystone! voiced by Andrew Frankel and Fajer Al-Kaisi. The characters are adults in this series and are also the owners of an bowling alley called "Quest Bowl". Unlike the original cartoon, Jonny and Hadji are not adoptive brothers but an “implicit” couple.
 Jonny Quest and Race Bannon appeared in the 2021 special Scooby-Doo, Where Are You Now!See also
List of works produced by Hanna-Barbera Productions
List of Hanna-Barbera characters

References

Further reading

Kevin Scott Collier. Jonny, Sinbad Jr. & Me''. CreateSpace Independent Publishing Platform, 2017.

External links

Jonny Quest at Don Markstein's Toonopedia. Archived from the original on October 21, 2016.

Television series by Hanna-Barbera
1960s American animated television series
1960s American comic science fiction television series
1964 American television series debuts
1965 American television series endings
American children's animated action television series
American children's animated adventure television series
American children's animated comic science fiction television series
American children's animated science fantasy television series
English-language television shows
Jonny Quest
The Funtastic World of Hanna-Barbera
American Broadcasting Company original programming
Television shows adapted into comics
Television shows adapted into films
Television shows adapted into video games
Television series by Screen Gems
Television series by Sony Pictures Television
Television series by Warner Bros. Television Studios
Animated television series about children
Animated television series about orphans